Die Pilgerin (English - The Female Pilgrim) is a two-part German television film directed by Philipp Kadelbach and produced by Benjamin Benedict. It premiered on 5 and 6 January 2014 on Zweiten Deutschen Fernsehen.

Plot
As a merchant's daughter in Ulm late in the 14th century, young Tilla Willinger lives a comfortable life until her father Eckhardt falls ill and decides to leave his business to Damian, the mayor's son and Tilla's fiancé. To prevent this and replace Damian as Eckhardt's heir, Tilla's brother Otfried secretly kills Eckhardt and conceals his will. Instead of Damian, Otfried forces Tilla to marry the vicious businessman Veit Gürtler, who dies of a heart attack on their wedding night.

Otfried also ignores his father's request to take his heart to Santiago de Compostela and so Tilla cuts it out herself and sets out alone, carrying a letter revealing Otfried's schemes. She disguises herself as a young man to join a group of pilgrims. Ignorant of the letter, Gürtler's illegitimate son Rigobert persecutes her on her journey on Otfried's orders - Rigobert also believes Tilla murdered his father and is out for revenge. To protect her the mayor's youngest son Sebastian Laux also joins her group of pilgrims.

Tilla and Sebastian are captured when the group is attacked in France - they escape but lose Eckhardt's heart, which falls into Rigobert's hands. She meets him and exchanges what she thinks is her brother's letter for the heart, not knowing Sebastian had swapped the document with a worthless letter. Rigobert hands it over to Otfried, who angrily arrests him. Tilla and Sebastian finally reach Santiago de Compostela and bury her father's heart and in the meantime Otfried kills Damian and imprisons his father, the mayor. Tilla returns home with the real letter and frees Rigobert and Damian's and Sebastian's father, who in turn accuses Otfried with the real document. Otfried tries to escape but is killed in the market square by Rigobert.

Cast
 Josefine Preuß: Tilla Willinger
 Jacob Matschenz: Sebastian Laux
 Volker Bruch: Otfried Willinger
 Friedrich von Thun: Koloman Laux
 Dietmar Bär: Veit Gürtler
 Sebastian Hülk: Rigobert Gürtler
 Ernst Stötzner: Vater Thomas
 Sven Pippig: Dieter
 Stipe Erceg: Gourdeville 
 Lucas Gregorowicz: Graf Aymer
 Roeland Wiesnekker: Schmied Ambros
 Jiri Roskot: Hermann
 Lucas Prisor: Damian
 Uwe Preuss: Eckhard Willinger
 Carlo Ljubek: Manfred
 Tómas Lemarquis: Sepp
 Laura de Boer: Felicia de Béarn

External links 

 
 http://www.filmportal.de/film/die-pilgerin_6c74828f6a034034b22e29fef98605de

References 

German television films
2014 television films
2014 films
Television series set in the Middle Ages
2010s German-language films
German-language television shows
ZDF original programming